The House of Commons Standing Committee on  Industry, Science and Technology (INDU) is a standing committee of the House of Commons of Canada.

Mandate
The mandate and management of Department of Industry and its subsidiary agencies:
Any government policies having to do with:
Industry and technology capability
Scientific research and development
Telecommunications policy
Investment, trade, small business and tourism
Rules and services supporting the effective operation of the market
Fluctuation of gas prices
The Perimeter Institute for Theoretical Physics
The e-commerce market in Canada

Membership

Subcommittees
Subcommittee on Agenda and Procedure (SIND)

References
Standing Committee on Industry, Science and Technology (INDU)

Industry
Politics of science
Science and technology in Canada